Canarana is a genus of longhorn beetles of the subfamily Lamiinae, containing the following species:

 Canarana affinis (Aurivillius, 1908)
 Canarana arguta Martins & Galileo, 2008
 Canarana brachialis (Guérin-Méneville, 1855)
 Canarana exotica Galileo & Martins, 2001
 Canarana marceloi Martins & Galileo, 1992
 Canarana nigripennis (Bates, 1866)
 Canarana roseicollis Galileo & Martins, 2004
 Canarana seminigra (Bates, 1866)
 Canarana tuberculicollis (Guérin-Méneville, 1855)

References

 
Cerambycidae genera